The Resistance is the fifth studio album by English rock band Muse, first released on 14 September 2009 through Warner Bros. Records and Muse's Helium-3 imprint. Produced by the band and mixed by Mark Stent, the album was recorded from September 2008 to May 2009 at Studio Bellini in Lake Como, Italy. Musically, the record is similar to some of the band's previous material, mixing orchestral elements with rock and electronic music. The album also saw the band craft a three-part, 13-minute long symphony piece titled "Exogenesis". Lyrically, it is a concept record, as well as a continuation of the themes from their previous records, being influenced by politics and more oppressive subjects.

The Resistance received generally positive reviews from critics, who praised its concept, instrumentation, influences and Bellamy's vocals. The album was compared favourably to the works of Radiohead and Queen, although some critics found its material overblown and clichéd. The album reached number one in 19 countries, and the top five in the United States and several others. It was later certified platinum in a number of countries, including the UK and US. The album was promoted with three commercial singles: "Uprising", "Undisclosed Desires", and "Resistance", with "Exogenesis: Symphony" receiving a Record Store Day vinyl release. The band also made a number of live appearances promoting the album, including The Resistance Tour. The record earned the band a Grammy Award for Best Rock Album in 2011. The Resistance has sold over 5 million copies worldwide, including diamond certification in France with over 900,000 units sold and platinum in the United States with over 1.2 million units sold, making it the band's most successful album to date.

Background and recording
The talk of a follow-up to Muse's 2006 album Black Holes and Revelations began in 2007, during that album's touring and promotion. In October, music magazine NME reported that Muse were "planning an 'electronic' album" and that the band "had 'loads of ideas' for their fifth record already." As touring came to a close, ideas and rumours began circulating more frequently – common themes were the inclusion of a "15-minute space-rock solo" song, the rejection of the 'conventional' album format and a possible series of singles; on 22 May 2008, NME reported that the band had begun writing songs for the new album, quoting frontman, vocalist, guitarist and pianist Matthew Bellamy as saying "What will come out of that is impossible to say."

The move away from releasing a conventional album was further discussed, with drummer Dominic Howard quoted as saying "It's not that we're against the concept of releasing an album in the traditional format at all. It's just the way the world and technology is evolving, it's presenting a canvas to do whatever you want and just release music as and when it is ready to release. It can happen much more organically." As of mid-2008, it was revealed that Muse had been writing a number of tracks, with more on the way in September. Despite this, Muse "warned fans not to expect a new album too soon," with bassist Christopher Wolstenholme quoted as explaining "I don't think there's anything that we're ready to record yet. We just wanted to get started this year, to get the ball rolling a little bit rather than wait for a year doing nothing then get in the studio, and go, 'What do we do now?'." The previously mentioned "15-minute space-rock solo" was discussed further late in the year, as Bellamy explained, "There is a new song in three parts, more of a symphony than a song, which I have been working on sporadically for many years."

Muse hired Rick Rubin, who had worked with artists including Metallica and Jay Z, to produce the album but scrapped the recordings in favour of producing the album themselves. At the 2010 Music Producers Guild awards, Bellamy sarcastically thanked Rubin for "teaching us how not to produce." The news of the possibility of a three-part 15-minute song also came with the revelation that the band had begun recording and were loosely aiming for a late-2009 release. In 2009, an "insider close to [...] Warners" revealed that Muse would release their new album in September and begin touring shortly afterwards. The band released three videos of recording footage, including a session in a lavatory. In March it was confirmed that Muse were to tour in the autumn, as well as with Irish band U2 in the United States in September, suggesting that the recording process was moving toward a conclusion.

Composition
Musically, The Resistance has been described as featuring art rock, progressive rock, symphonic rock, space rock, alternative rock, and arena rock. In their review, French media source JudeBox compared Bellamy's vocal performance to that of Radiohead frontman Thom Yorke and identifying classical composers Frédéric Chopin and Franz Liszt as influences for "Exogenesis: Symphony". Mojo quoted Bellamy as revealing that the song featured an orchestra of over 40 musicians.

Promotion and release

Muse announced the title The Resistance on their Twitter page on 22 May, while the first song was officially announced as "United States of Eurasia" on the official band website, deciphered by fans from a picture of a piece of sheet music held by Bellamy in a photo uploaded on the Twitter page. Following this news, Howard posted a blog on his MySpace account detailing the progress made by the band by saying "Yes, The Resistance is on its way. Out in a few months hopefully. We've just started mixing some tracks and it sounds wicked. Still got a bit more work to do but it's coming along nicely." The album was mixed by Mark Stent at Muse's studio and was supported by an international tour.

On 16 June 2009 it was confirmed on the band's official website that the album would be released on 14 September 2009. In a Twitter update by Wolstenholme on 23 June, it was revealed that the band had completed the album, with only mastering left to complete in New York. On 3 July, the band began updating their Twitter profile with the track listing for The Resistance, which was completed by the end of the day. On 14 July, Muse confirmed via Twitter that the first single from the album would be "Uprising". On 17 August 2009, iTunes gave 30-second previews for each of the songs on the album. "Undisclosed Desires" was uploaded to Muse's official website for streaming by website members on 9 September 2009. From 10 September, the album was made available to stream for free on the official website of English newspaper The Guardian.

The Resistance was released on iTunes as one of the first iTunes LPs. It contains the album as well as added extras such as animated artwork and behind the scenes videos. It was later announced in September that a New Moon remix of "I Belong to You" would be included on the soundtrack to New Moon, the second film in the Twilight Saga film series. The soundtrack to the first film had featured another song by Muse: "Supermassive Black Hole". The New Moon remix has additional guitars added, and omits the "Mon cœur s'ouvre a ta voix" section.

As well as the CD, CD+DVD, LP & download versions of the album, Muse also released a box set containing the CD+DVD, LPs, USB stick containing the album with a bespoke media player & a print. A special version, limited to 5000 copies were also made which also contained a DVD containing a 5.1 surround sound mix of The Resistance, this mix also includes a longer version of "Unnatural Selection". An instrumental version of the album has been professionally mixed, and is available on the internet.

Tour

On 18 August 2009, a duo of concerts collectively entitled "A Seaside Rendezvous" were confirmed for 4 and 5 September. The concerts were the first in the band's hometown of Teignmouth in over ten years, as well as the first shows since their appearance at V Festival in August 2008. The performances included the debut appearances of five songs from the upcoming album, including lead single "Uprising", "Undisclosed Desires", and "Resistance". The band also performed a small number of shows at other venues in Europe, before they supported U2 for nine dates on the North American leg of their 360° Tour in September and October and in South America in March and April 2011.

A promotional tour was first confirmed by Muse in March 2009 when they announced that "We are pleased to confirm that Muse will be touring in the UK, Europe and North America this autumn." In June 2009, the band confirmed the dates for an opening European leg of "The Resistance Tour", which they announced would comprise 30 shows. Tickets for the shows in the United Kingdom, Sweden and France went on sale from 5 June, while tickets for other European dates went on fan pre-sale between 11 June (Netherlands) and 17 June (Spain). Tickets for the UK arena dates, both pre-sale and general sale, sold out within minutes of going on sale. On 22 September 2009, it was announced that extra tickets for many of the European concerts would be sold beginning on 24 September.

The band also performed a small number of shows at other venues in Europe, before they supported Irish rock band U2 for nine dates on the North American leg of their 360° Tour in September and October and in South America in March and April 2011.The opening European leg began on 22 October 2009 and ended on 4 December 2009, comprising 30 shows. The second leg, which began on 7 January 2010, included thirteen shows, seven of which were part of the Australasian Big Day Out shows. A North American leg of 26 shows took place in early 2010. Nine stadium shows took place in Europe in 2010, with three of those dates taking place at Wembley Stadium and Old Trafford Cricket Ground. A second round of North American concerts took place throughout September and October 2010.

At the conclusion of 2010, the tour was placed on Pollstar's annual "Year End Top 50 Worldwide Concert Tours", and appeared 13th worldwide, earning over $76 million with 64 shows in 2010.

Reception

The Resistance received generally positive reviews from critics upon its release. At Metacritic, which assigns a normalised rating out of 100 to reviews from mainstream critics, the album received an average score of 72 based on 23 reviews, indicating "generally favorable reviews."

Andrew Leahey of AllMusic praised the album, highlighting "Guiding Light", "United States of Eurasia", and "Exogenesis", and calling it "by and large a fantastic record". In an interview with The Sunday Times, Dan Cairns wrote that "Muse have made an album of genius, brilliance and beauty". NME identified "Exogenesis: Symphony" as one of the highlights of the album, describing it as "more bombastic than anything Muse have ever previously done" and revealing that it features "classical piano from Bellamy and a full orchestra throughout."

Multiple reviews criticised the album for lacking originality, in some instances commenting it was a caricature of progressive rock. Rolling Stone lauded "Uprising" as an "industrial-flavored" song that proved that Muse could still "whip up an almighty roar", but dismissed the album as a whole as clichéd and borrowing shamelessly from Queen. Ben Patashnik from NME felt that the album was "genius" in parts, but criticised it for producing something "conceptually impressive but musically all too familiar". Pitchfork gave the album a mixed review, stating that the songs were "an outgrowth of wanting to make the music as big, inclusive and as singalong as possible, rather than any inchoate political impulses," criticising Bellamy for "constantly tossing out mass-shout-along-ready lyrics". However, the review went on to conclude that "Judged on its own terms – out of control scale, genre-smashing ambition, musical and vocal virtuosity - The Resistance is a success."

Queen guitarist Brian May praised the Queen-influenced sound that Muse incorporated into the album. "I love it, I think it's great stuff," May told the BBC. "I think they're very good boys and extremely talented, and like us they have their tongue in cheek a lot of the time," May said. He described the track "United States of Eurasia" as "brilliantly done".

Muse won the Grammy Award for Best Rock Album for The Resistance at the 53rd Annual Grammy Awards in 2011.

Track listing

Notes

1. "Collateral Damage" contains elements of Nocturne in E flat major, Op. 9, No. 2, composed by Frédéric Chopin.
2. "Mon cœur s'ouvre a ta voix" written by Camille Saint-Saëns.

Personnel

Muse
 Matthew Bellamy – lead vocals, lead and rhythm guitars, keyboards, piano, synthesizers, programming, production
 Christopher Wolstenholme – bass, backing vocals, production
 Dominic Howard – drums, percussion, synthesizers, programming, production

Session musicians
 Edodea Ensemble; orchestra, conducted by Audrey Riley and led by concertmaster Edoardo de Angelis
 Enrico Gabrielli – bass clarinet on "I Belong to You"
 Tom Kirk – handclaps and football hooligan noises on "Uprising"

Main production personnel
 Adrian Bushby – engineering, handclaps and football hooligan noises on "Uprising"
 Ted Jensen – mastering
 Mark "Spike" Stent – mixing

Additional personnel
 La Boca – artwork
 Des Broadbery – additional technical and logistical support
 Danny Clinch – photography
 Tommaso Colliva – additional engineering, technical setup
 Matthew Green – mixing assistance
 Paul Reeve – additional vocal production, handclaps and football hooligan noises on "Uprising"

Release history

Charts

Weekly charts

Year-end charts

Certifications

}

Singles

MTV EXIT, the MTV campaign to eradicate the human exploitation and trafficking especially in Asia and Pacific, in partnership with USAID, released a music video "Muse and MTV EXIT: MK Ultra", the third in a series of award-winning music video collaborations to highlight the dangers and impact of human trafficking. Produced for the band's track "MK Ultra", the video was launched globally across all of MTV's properties on-air and on-line on 17 September 2010.

References

Muse (band) albums
2009 albums
Concept albums
Grammy Award for Best Rock Album